A list of rivers of North Rhine-Westphalia, Germany:

A
Aa, left tributary of the Möhne
Aa, left tributary of the Nethe
Aa, left tributary of the Werre
Aabach, tributary of the Afte
Aabach, small river in the Ems river system
Abbabach
Abrocksbach
Afte
Agger
Ahler Bruchgraben
Ahr
Ahre
Ahse
Alaunbach
Albaumer Bach
Alche
Alme
Alte Emscher
Alte Hessel
Alte Issel
Altenau
Angel
Angerbach
Ankerbach
Arbach
Armuthsbach
Arpe, left tributary of the Wenne joining it at Berge (a district of Meschede)
Arpe, left tributary of the Wenne joining it at Niederberndorf (a district of Schmallenberg)
Arzdorfer Bach, alternative name for Godesberger Bach
Asbeke
Asdorf
Aue
Auelsbach
Auer Bach
Aupke
Axtbach

B
Baagebach
Baarbach
Babenhausener Bach
Bachseifen
Bachumer Bach
Banfe
Bärenbach
Bastau
Beberbach
Beckendorfer Mühlenbach
Bega
Beilbach
Beke
Bekelbach
Belgenbach
Bendahler Bach
Benfe
Bennier Graben
Bentgraben
Berghauser Bach
Berkel
Berkelbach
Berlebecke
Bermecke, drained by the Heve
Bermecke, tributary of the Möhne
Bever, tributary of the Ems
Bever, tributary of the Weser
Bever, tributary of the Wupper
Beverbach
Bexter
Biber
Bieberbach
Bieke, tributary of the Bigge
Bieke, tributary of the Elpe
Bieke, right tributary of the Glenne
Bieke, tributary of the Kleine Henne
Bigge
Bilsteinbach
Blombach
Bocholter Aa
Bockhorner Bach
Borbach, tributary of the Ennepe
Borbach, tributary of the Ruhr
Bormelsbach
Börnepader
Bornscheider Bach
Börstelbach
Borstenbach
Bowerre
Brabecke
Brachtpe
Bramschebach
Brandbach
Brandenbaumer Bach
Brebach
Bremecke, tributary of the Hoppecke
Bremecke, tributary of the Möhne
Briller Bach
Bröl
Bruchbach
Bruchhauser Bach
Brucht
Brunsbach, tributary of the Sülz
Brunsbach, tributary of the Wupper
Buchenhofener Siepen
Buchheller
Bückeburger Aue
Bürgerbuschbach
Burgholzbach
Butterbach

C
Calenberger Bach
Casumer Bach
Compbach

D
Dalke
Dammpader
Darmühlenbach
Deilbach
Derenbach
Dettmers Bach
Dhünn
Dichbach
Dickopsbach
Dielenpader
Diemel
Diestelbach
Dinkel
Dondert
Dornmühlenbach
Dörpe
Dörspe
Dortenbach
Dreierwalder Aa
Dreisbach, tributary of the Bröl
Dreisbach, tributary of the Sieg
Duffesbach
Durbeke
Düsedieksbach
Düssel

E
Edelrather Bach
Eder, tributary of the Fulda
Eder, tributary of the Eggel
Eggel
Ehrenberger Bach
Eickumer Mühlenbach
Eifgenbach
Eipbach
Eisernbach
Eistringhauser Bach
Ellebach
Ellerbach
Ellerbrockgraben
Ellersieker Bach
Elpe
Elpenbach
Else, tributary of the Lenne
Else, tributary of the Werre
Elsebach
Elsoff
Elspebach
Elsternbuschbach
Emmer
Emmerbach
Ems
Emscher
Emsdettener Mühlenbach
Endenicher Bach
Ennepe
Erft
Erlenbach
Erpa
Eschbach
Eschenbeek
Eschensiepen
Eselsbach, left tributary of the Else
Eselsbach, right tributary of the Warmenau
Esselbach
Eusternbach
Exter

F
Falbecke, alternative name for Glingebach
Felderbach
Ferndorfbach
Finkelbach
Finkenbach
Fischbach
Fischertaler Bach
Flehbach
Florabach
Forellenbach
Forthbach
Freebach
Fretterbach
Frischebach
Frischhofsbach
Frohnhauser Bach
Frohnholzbach
Fülsenbecke
Furlbach

G
Galkhauser Bach
Gaulbach
Gebke, right tributary of the Ruhr in Meschede
Gebke, right tributary of the Ruhr in Wennemen, district of Meschede
Gehle
Geinegge
Gelderner Fleuth
Gelpe
Genkel
Geseker Bach
Gewinghauser Bach
Gierskoppbach
Gierzhagener Bach
Gievenbach
Gillbach
Gilsbach
Gladbach
Glane
Glanerbeek
Glasbach
Gleierbach, tributary of the Lenne in Schmallenberg
Gleierbach, tributary of the Lenne in Gleierbrück
Glenne, tributary of the Lippe
Glenne, tributary of the Möhne
Glimke
Glingebach
Godesberger Bach
Goldbach
Gosenbach
Göttchesbach
Grafschaft
Grenzbach
Grift
Grippenbach
Große Aa
Große Aue
Große Dumecke
Große Schmalenau
Großer Bastergraben
Großer Dieckriver
Grube
Grubebach
Grüner Bach
Gruttbach
Günse
Gürzenicher Bach
Gutenbach

H
Habighorster Bach
Haferbach
Hagenbach
Hagerbeck
Hahnenbach
Hahnerberger Siepen
Halle
Hallerbach
Halstenbach
Halstenbecker Bach
Halterner Mühlenbach
Halverder Aa
Halverder-Schaler Aa
Hammer Bach
Hanfbach
Hardenberger Bach
Hardtbach, tributary of the Rhine
Hardtbach, tributary of the Wupper
Harlebach
Hartmecke
Haßbach
Hasselbach, tributary of the Dalke
Hasselbach, tributary of the Werre
Hatzenbeck
Hauptkanal Sterkrade
Hebbecke
Heder
Heesbach
Heidenbach
Heilsbach
Heipker Bach
Hellbach
Helle
Heller
Hemelter Bach
Hengelsbach
Hengstener Bach
Henne
Herbringhauser Bach
Hessel
Hettmecke
Heubach, upstream of the Halterner Mühlenbach
Heubach, tributary of the Emmer
Heusiepen
Heve
Hilgenbach
Hillbringse
Hillebach
Hirschberger Bach
Höbecke
Hofsiefen
Hohenhager Bach
Hohnderfeldbach
Hohner Bach
Holperbach
Holtebach
Holzbach, tributary of the Ahse
Holzbach, tributary of the Auelsbach
Holzbach, tributary of the Belgenbach
Holzbach, tributary of the Dickopsbach
Holzbach, tributary of the Ems
Holzbach, tributary of the Emscher
Holzbach, tributary of the Erft
Holzbach, tributary of the Finkenbach
Holzer Bach
Honebach
Hönne
Hönnige
Hoppecke
Horbacher Bach
Hormecke
Hörster Bach
Hörsterholzer Bach
Hovebach
Hover Bach
Hubertusbach
Humme
Hundem
Hunnebecke

I
Ickbach
Ihne
Ilpe
Ilse, tributary of the Bega
Ilse, tributary of the Lahn
Inde
Irserbach
Issumer Fleuth
Itter, tributary of the Diemel
Itter, tributary of the Rhine

J
Jabach
Johannisbach
Jöllenbecker Mühlenbach

K
Kall
Kalle
Kaltenbach
Kanal III C
Kanal III3b
Kannenbach
Katzenbach
Kelbke
Kendel
Kerspe
Kervenheimer Mühlenfleuth
Kielhackensiepen
Kilverbach
Kinderbach, tributary of the Kannenbach southwest of Münster
Kinderbach, tributary of the Münstersche Aa north of Münster
Kittelbach
Kleine Aa
Kleine Düssel
Kleine Emscher
Kleine Gebke
Kleine Henne
Kleine Schmalenau
Kleinebach
Kleiner Wildenbach
Kleppe
Klosterbach, tributary of the Große Aue
Klosterbach,  tributary of the Schwarzbach
Kloßsiepen
Klusensprung
Knisterbach
Knochenbach
Knollerbach
Knöselbach
Köhm
Kollenbach
Kothener Bach
Köttelbach
Krabach
Krampsbach
Krebsbach
Kretzer Bach
Kreuzbach
Krollbach
Krudtscheider Bach
Krullsbach
Kühlbach
Künsebecker Bach
Kürtener Sülz
Küttelbieke
Kyll

L
Ladbergener Mühlbach
Lahn
Laibach
Lambach, tributary of the Loper Bach
Lambach, tributary of the Eickumer Mühlenbach
Landerbach
Langer Bach
Lannertbach
Latrop
Leimbach, tributary of the Dhünn
Leimbach, tributary of the Wupper
Leiße
Lenne
Leppe
Leyerbach
Lichtebach
Liese, tributary of the Glenne
Liese, tributary of the Nuhne
Liesendählke
Lindlarer Sülz
Linkläuer Bach
Linnenbeeke
Linnepe
Linnicher Mühlenteich
Lippe
Lippinghauser Bach
Lister
Littfe
Lobach
Lochbach
Loddenbach
Loemühlenbach
Logebach
Lohbach
Lohmühlenbach
Löhner Schulbach
Lollenbach
Lombach
Loopebach
Loper Bach
Lörmecke
Lottenbach
Lötzelbach
Lüntenbeck
Lütte Bermecke
Lutter, headwater stream of the Aa
Lutter, tributary of the Ems

M
Mahlbergbach
Maibach
Malefinkbach
Markbach
Marpe
Marscheider Bach
Maspernpader
Mausbach
Meckelbach
Medebach
Mehner Bach
Melbbach
Menkebach
Mersbach
Merzbach
Mettmecke
Mirker Bach
Mitbach
Mittelbach
Mittelbuschbach
Möhne
Moorbach, tributary of the Bever
Moorbach, tributary of the Werfener Bach
Morsbach
Mühlbach
Mühlenbach, tributary of the Eggel
Mühlenbach, tributary of the Ruhr
Mühlenbach, tributary of the Werre
Mühlenbach, tributary of the Schwarzbach
Mülmecke
Münstersche Aa
Murbach
Murmelbach
Mutzbach

N
Naafbach
Nahmerbach
Namenlose
Napte
Nebenkämper Siefen
Neerdar
Neffelbach
Neger, tributary of the Bieke
Neger, tributary of the Ruhr
Neismecke
Nesselbach
Nethe
Netphe
Nette, tributary of the Alme
Nette, tributary of the Lenne
Nette, tributary of the Niers
Neye
Nienberger Bach
Nierbach
Niers
Niese
Nöllenberger Bach
Nonnenbach
Nordbach
Norfbach
Norrenberger Bach
Noßbach
Nuhne

O
Obernau
Oberscheider Bach
Oberwiesengraben
Odeborn
Oefter Bach
Oesber Bach
Oese
Oetternbach
Ölbach, tributary of the Berkel
Ölbach, tributary of the Wapelbach
Olef
Olfe, tributary of the Nuhne
Olfe, tributary of the Werse
Olligsbach
Olpe, tributary of the Bigge
Olpe, tributary of the Hundem
Omerbach
Ophover Mühlenbach
Orke
Orpe
Öse
Ösper
Ossenbeck
Ostbach, tributary of the Else
Ostbach, tributary of the Emscher
Ostscheider Bach
Otterbach, tributary of the Inde
Otterbach, tributary of the Weser
Ottersbach

P
Pader
Passade
Pastoratshofer Bach
Pau
Paunell
Perlenbach
Peschsiefen
Pixwaager Bach
Platißbach
Pleisbach
Poggenbach
Pöppelsche
Pottsiepen
Pulheimer Bach
Pustmühlenbach

Q
Quamecke
Quirrenbach

R
Rahmede
Randelbach
Rarbach
Rehmerloh-Mennighüffer Mühlenbach
Reiherbach
Reingser Bach
Remelsbach
Remlingrader Bach
Renau
Rengse
Repe
Rethlager Bach
Rhedaer Bach
Rhine
Rheindorfer Bach
Riedenbach
Rinderbach
Rinnebach
Rißneibach
Rodenbach
Roderbach
Röhr
Röhrbach
Rolfbach
Romecke, tributary of the Möhne
Romecke, tributary of the Linnepe
Ronceva
Rose
Rosenaue
Rospebach
Roßsiefenbach
Rotbach, tributary of the Erft
Rotbach, tributary of the Rhine
Rothbroicher Bach
Rothenbach, tributary of the Ems
Rothenbach, tributary of the Werre
Rothobornpader
Rottscheider Bach
Rumbach
Rur
Rutenbeck
Ruthebach
Ruthenbach

S
Saalbach
Sagebach
Salwey
Salze
Saubach
Sauer
Schaler Aa
Scharrenberger Bach
Scheebach
Schelderbach
Schellenbeck
Scheuerbach
Schierenbeke
Schinderbach
Schipbeek
Schledde, tributary of the Ahse
Schledde, tributary of the Störmeder Bach
Schlinge
Schlingenbach
Schloßhofbach
Schmala
Schmalenbach
Schmalenhofer Bach
Schmelzbach
Schmitteborner Bach
Schmittwasser
Schnakenbach
Schönebeck
Schorenbach
Schottmecke
Schwalm
Schwarzbach, tributary of the Johannisbach i.e. Westfälische Aa
Schwarzbach, of the Bergisches Land, tributary of the Rhine
Schwarzbach, tributary of the Emscher
Schwarzbach, tributary of the Wupper
Schwarzer Graben
Schwarzes Siepen
Schwarzwasserbach
Schwelge
Schwelme
Sengbach
Sennebach
Senserbach
Seßmarbach
Settmecke
Sichter
Sickingmühlenbach
Siebenbach
Siechenbach
Sieg
Siegburger Mühlengraben
Siekbach
Silberbach
Silvertbach
Soestbach
Sonneborn
Sorpe, tributary of the Lenne
Sorpe, tributary of the Röhr
Speller Aa
Spenger Mühlenbach
Spreeler Bach
Springebach
Springer Bach
Sprockhöveler Bach
Sprungbach
Stackenberger Bach
Stakelberger Bach
Steinagger
Steinbach, tributary of the Laerbach
Steinbach, tributary of the Vilicher Bach
Steinbecke, tributary of the Möhne
Steinbecke, tributary of the Valme
Steinbeke
Steinbruch Siefen
Steinfurter Aa
Steinhauser Bach, tributary of the Wupper
Steinhauserbergbach
Steinsiekbach
Stever
Stoffelsberger Bach
Störmeder Bach
Strangbach
Strombach
Strothbach
Strothe
Strülleken
Strunde
Sudbach
Sudbrackbach
Sülz
Sunderbach, tributary of the Trüggelbach 
Sunderbach, tributary of that Else that is a tributary of the Werre
Swist

T
Teufelsbach, in the district Beuel of Bonn
Teufelsbach, a tributary of the Müggenbach which is itself a tributary of the Morsbach
Teufelsbach, a tributary of the Rhynerscher Bach
Thelenbach
Thune
Thunebach
Toppmannsbach
Treise
Trüfte
Trüggelbach
Tüterbach
Twiste

U
Uelfe
Uentrop
Uhlenbach
Untreue
Urft

V
Valme
Varresbeck
Vechte
Veischede
Verse
Veybach
Vichtbach
Vilicher Bach
Villiper Bach
Violenbach
Vlattener Bach
Vogelsangbach
Volkersbach
Volme
Vorthgraben
Voßmecke

W
Wacker
Wahnbach
Walbach
Waldbach, tributary of the Gürzenicher Bach
Waldbach, tributary of the Röhr
Waldbach, tributary of the similar named river Waldbach that is a tributary of the Röhr
Waldbrölbach
Waldsiepen
Wanne, tributary of the Möhne
Wanne, tributary of the Ruhr
Wannebach, right tributary of the Lenne
Wannebach, left tributary of the Ruhr
Wannebach, right tributary of the Ruhr
Wannenbach
Wapelbach
Warme Pader
Warmenau
Wehebach
Wehmerhorster Bach
Weibe
Weierbach
Weilandsiepen
Weiß
Welplagebach
Weltersbach
Wendbach
Wenne
Werfener Bach
Werre
Werschbach
Werse
Werthenbach
Weser, flows into the North Sea
Weser, tributary of the Ourthe in Belgium
Westbach
Wester
Westerholter Bach
Westernahbach
Wideybach
Wiebach
Wiebelhäuser Bach
Wiebelsaat
Wiedey
Wiehl
Wiembach
Wiembecke
Wiesengraben
Wiggenbach
Wildbach
Wilde Aa
Wildenbach
Wilhelmstaler Bach
Willicher Fleuth
Wimberbach
Windwehe
Wippe
Wipperfelder Bach
Wisser Bach
Wolfsbach
Wörbke
Wupper
Wurm

Z
Bachlauf an der Zietenstraße

 
North Rhine-Westphalia-related lists
North Rhine-Westphalia